The 2019 Fiji Premier League was the 43rd season of the Fiji Premier League (Vodafone Premier League for sponsorship reasons), the top-tier football league in Fiji organized by the Fiji Football Association since its establishment in 1977. It started on 19 January 2019. Lautoka are the defending champions.

Team changes

To Fiji Premier League

Promoted from 2018 Vodafone Senior League
 Nasinu

From Fiji Premier League

Relegated to 2019 Vodafone Senior League
 Dreketi

Teams
A total of eight teams compete in the league.

Stadiums and locations

League table

Results

Top scorers

See also 
 2019 Vodafone Senior League
 2019 Inter-District Championship
 2019 Inter-District Championship - Senior Division
 2019 Fiji Battle of the Giants
 2019 Fiji Football Association Cup Tournament

References

External links
RSSSF

Fiji Premier League seasons
Fiji
Premier League